List of bisexual people including famous people who identify as bisexual and deceased people who have been identified as bisexual.

G

H

I

J

K

L

M

References

G
Lists of LGBT-related people
people G